"Tojo"  "Tojo Never Made it to Darwin" is a song by Australian rock group Hoodoo Gurus. It was released in June 1983 as the second single from their debut studio album, Stoneage Romeos. It was written by their lead singer-guitarist, Dave Faulkner. It was also featured on their first album Stoneage Romeos (1984), which was produced by Alan Thorne. Tojo in the title refers to the World War II Japanese General and Prime Minister Hideki Tōjō.

"Tojo" saw the introduction of new band members Clyde Bramley and Brad Shepherd, with Bramley providing bass, which had previously been noticeably absent from the band.'"Tojo" was an answer song to an Australian hit of a few years earlier, "Santa Never Made it Into Darwin" which had been released to raise money for the victims of Cyclone Tracy which had almost destroyed Darwin on Christmas Eve, 1975 (sic). During World War II the Japanese army invaded New Guinea but failed to reach Australia thanks to the heroic resistance however Darwin was bombed heavily and often.' - Dave Faulkner.

"Santa Never Made It into Darwin" had been recorded by New Zealanders Bill (Cate) & Boyd (Robinson) which reached No. 2 in Australia during February1975, Cyclone Tracy actually devastated Darwin on Christmas Eve / Christmas Day 1974.

"Tojo" was performed by You Am I on the 2005 tribute album Stoneage Cameos (see Stoneage Romeos); while "(Let's All) Turn On" was performed by The Wrights.

Track listing
 7" single (BTS984)
 "Tojo" (Faulkner) — 3:11
 "(Let's All) Turn On" (Faulkner) — 3:00

Personnel
Credited to:
 James Baker — drums
 Clyde Bramley — bass, vocals
 Dave Faulkner — lead vocals, guitar
 Brad Shepherd — guitar, vocals
 Producer — Alan Thorne
 Design (cover) — Yanni Stumbles, Faulkner
 Photo (rear cover) — Annie Sidlo

Charts

References

1983 singles
Hoodoo Gurus songs
1983 songs
Songs written by Dave Faulkner (musician)
Songs about Australia